Massiré Kanté (born 31 March 1989) is a French professional footballer who plays as a midfielder for Championnat National 2 club Mulhouse.

Career 
Kanté made his Ligue 2 debut during the 2011–12 season for Le Mans, where he played 14 times in total, scoring one goal.

References

External links
 Massiré Kanté profile at Foot-National.com
 
 

1989 births
Living people
People from Courbevoie
Footballers from Hauts-de-Seine
French footballers
French people of Malian descent
Association football midfielders
Le Mans FC players
CA Bastia players
Red Star F.C. players
RC Strasbourg Alsace players
CS Sedan Ardennes players
FC Martigues players
FC Fleury 91 players
SC Toulon players
SC Bastia players
US Colomiers Football players
Ligue 2 players
Championnat National players
Championnat National 2 players
Championnat National 3 players